"Words" is a song by the New Zealand singer and songwriter Sharon O'Neill. The song was released in New Zealand in September 1979 as the lead single from her second studio album, Sharon O'Neill (1980). The song was released in Australia in April 1980 as her first single in that country.

Track listings 
New Zealand 7" (BA 222561) 
Side A "Words" - 3:16
Side B "Face in a Rainbow"

Australia 7" 
Side A "Words" - 3:16
Side B "Dance All Night"

Charts

References 

1979 singles
1979 songs
Sharon O'Neill songs
Songs written by Sharon O'Neill